Josu Anuzita Alegría (born 13 January 1964), sometimes known simply as Josu or Yosu, is a Spanish professional football coach and former player who is the goalkeeper coach of Spanish club Eibar. As a player, he was a goalkeeper.

Playing career
Josu began his career with local club Arenas Club, and was named the best goalkeeper at the 1984 Trofeo La Galleta de Urduliz. This earned him a move to Segunda División B side Sestao Sport, and played three matches as they earned promotion at the end of the 1984–85 season. By 1987, he was Sestao's first choice keeper, a position he held until 1990, when he joined fellow Segunda División side Deportivo La Coruña. He played in every match bar one as Depor finished the 1990–91 season as runners-up, earning promotion to La Liga. Francisco Liaño, who had replaced Josu at Sestao, joined Deportivo in the summer of 1991, and Josu fell behind both Liaño and Juan Canales, who signed from Logroñés, in the pecking order.

Josu made his top flight debut on 2 February 1992 in a home fixture against Valencia at Estadio Riazor. He replaced the injured Liaño after 28 minutes, and conceded the only goal of the game to Fernando Giner three minutes later. However, the predominance of Liaño meant that Josu made only 13 appearances in two La Liga campaigns before leaving the club in 1993. He spent the following season as first choice at Segunda División side Cádiz, who sufferred a second consecutive relegation, and 1994–95 with fellow second tier team Atlético Marbella.

Josu returned to La Liga with Salamanca ahead of the 1995–96 campaign, but played only two matches, with Iñaki Aizpurua preferred as first choice keeper. Josu then dropped into the third tier with Málaga, playing 31 times in his sole season with the club. He rounded out his career with three seasons at Barakaldo in Segunda División B, amassing 26 appearances, before retiring in 2001 at the age of 37.

Coaching career
Following his retirement, Josu returned to his hometown and first club, Arenas Club, becoming their manager for the 2007–08 Tercera División campaign, which they finished in 12th place. He later spent some time working at Lezama, the training ground of Athletic Bilbao, and since 2015 has been the goalkeeping coach at Eibar.

Honours
Sestao Sport
Segunda División B: 1984–85
Copa de la Liga Segunda División B: 1985

Deportivo La Coruña
Segunda División runners-up: 1990–91

Career statistics

Club

1. Appearances in the 1999 Segunda División B play-offs
2. Appearances in the 2000 Segunda División B play-offs

References

External links

1964 births
Living people
Spanish footballers
Footballers from Getxo
Association football goalkeepers
La Liga players
Segunda División players
Segunda División B players
Sestao Sport Club footballers
Deportivo de La Coruña players
Cádiz CF players
CA Marbella footballers
UD Salamanca players
Málaga CF players
Barakaldo CF footballers
Spanish football managers
Tercera División managers
Arenas Club de Getxo managers
Association football coaches
Athletic Bilbao non-playing staff